Fullerene chemistry is a field of organic chemistry devoted to the chemical properties of fullerenes. Research in this field is driven by the need to functionalize fullerenes and tune their properties. For example, fullerene is notoriously insoluble and adding a suitable group can enhance solubility. By adding a polymerizable group, a fullerene polymer can be obtained. Functionalized fullerenes are divided into two classes: exohedral fullerenes with substituents outside the cage and endohedral fullerenes with trapped molecules inside the cage.

This article covers the chemistry of these so-called "buckyballs," while the chemistry of carbon nanotubes is covered in carbon nanotube chemistry.

Chemical properties of fullerenes 

Fullerene or C60 is soccer-ball-shaped or Ih with 12 pentagons and 20 hexagons. According to Euler's theorem these 12 pentagons are required for closure of the carbon network consisting of n hexagons and C60 is the first stable fullerene because it is the smallest possible to obey this rule. In this structure none of the pentagons make contact with each other. Both C60 and its relative C70 obey this so-called isolated pentagon rule (IPR). The next homologue C84 has  24 IPR isomers of which several are isolated and another 51,568 non-IPR isomers. Non-IPR fullerenes have thus far only been isolated as endohedral fullerenes such as Tb3N@C84 with two fused pentagons at the apex of an egg-shaped cage. or as fullerenes with exohedral stabilization such as C50Cl10  and reportedly C60H8. Fullerenes with fewer than 60 carbons do not obey isolated pentagon rule (IPR).

Because of the molecule's spherical shape the carbon atoms are highly pyramidalized, which has far-reaching consequences for reactivity. It is estimated that strain energy constitutes 80% of the heat of formation. The conjugated carbon atoms respond to deviation from planarity by orbital rehybridization of the sp² orbitals and π orbitals to a sp2.27 orbital with a gain in p-character. The p lobes extend further outside the surface than they do into the interior of the sphere and this is one of the reasons a fullerene is electronegative. The other reason is that the empty low-lying π* orbitals also have a high s character.

The double bonds in fullerene are not all the same. Two groups can be identified: 30 so-called [6,6] double bonds connect two hexagons and 60 [5,6] bonds connect a hexagon and a pentagon. Of the two the [6,6] bonds are shorter with more double-bond character and therefore a hexagon is often represented as a cyclohexatriene and a pentagon as a pentalene or [5]radialene. In other words, although the carbon atoms in fullerene are all conjugated the superstructure is not a super aromatic compound.  The X-ray diffraction bond length values are 139.1 pm for the [6,6] bond and 145.5 pm for the [5,6] bond.

C60 fullerene has 60 π electrons but a closed shell configuration requires 72 electrons. The fullerene is able to acquire the missing electrons by reaction with potassium to form first the  salt and then the  In this compound the bond length alternation observed in the parent molecule has vanished.

Fullerene reactions

Fullerenes tend to react as electrophiles. An additional driving force is relief of strain when double bonds become saturated. Key in this type of reaction is the level of functionalization i.e. monoaddition or multiple additions and in case of multiple additions their topological relationships (new substituents huddled together or evenly spaced). In conformity with IUPAC rules, the terms methanofullerene  are used to indicate  the ring-closed (cyclopropane) fullerene derivatives, and fulleroid to ring-open (methanoannulene) structures.

Nucleophilic additions
Fullerenes react as electrophiles with a host of nucleophiles in nucleophilic additions. The intermediary formed carbanion is captured by another electrophile. Examples of nucleophiles are Grignard reagents and organolithium reagents. For example, the reaction of C60 with methylmagnesium chloride stops quantitatively at the penta-adduct with the methyl groups centered around a cyclopentadienyl anion which is subsequently protonated. Another nucleophilic reaction is the Bingel reaction.
Fullerene reacts with chlorobenzene and aluminium chloride in a Friedel-Crafts alkylation type reaction. In this hydroarylation the reaction product is the 1,2-addition adduct (Ar-CC-H).

Pericyclic reactions
The [6,6] bonds of fullerenes react as dienes or dienophiles in cycloadditions for instance Diels-Alder reactions. 4-membered rings can be obtained by [2+2]cycloadditions for instance with benzyne. An example of a 1,3-dipolar cycloaddition to a 5-membered ring is the Prato reaction.

Hydrogenations
Fullerenes are easily hydrogenated by several methods. The smallest perhydrogenated fullerene known is dodecahedrane C20H20, formally derived from the smallest possible but unknown fullerene, C20, which comprises just 12 pentagonal faces.

Examples of hydrofullerenes are C60H18 and C60H36. However, completely hydrogenated C60H60 is only hypothetical because of large strain. Highly hydrogenated fullerenes are not stable, as prolonged hydrogenation of fullerenes by direct reaction with hydrogen gas at high temperature conditions results in cage fragmentation. At the final reaction stage this causes collapse of cage structure with formation of polycyclic aromatic hydrocarbons.

C60 reacts with Li[BHEt3]  to the weak base [HC60]−, which is isolated as Li[HC60][H2O]6-9.

Halogenation 
Fullerenes can react with halogens. The preferred pattern for addition C60 is calculated to be 1,9- for small groups and 1,7- for bulky groups. C60F60 is a possible structure. C60 reacts with Cl2 gas at 250 °C to a material with average composition C60Cl24, although only C60 can be detected by mass spectrometry. With liquid Br2 C60 yields C60Br24, in which all 24 bromine atoms are equivalent.  The only characterized iodine-containing compounds
are intermediates: [C60][CH2I2][C6H6] and [C60][I2]2.

Oxidations
Although more difficult than reduction, oxidation of fullerene is possible for instance with oxygen and osmium tetraoxide.

Hydroxylations
Fullerenes can be hydroxylated to fullerenols or fullerols. Water solubility depends on the total number of hydroxyl groups  that can be attached. One method is fullerene reaction in diluted  sulfuric acid and potassium nitrate to C60(OH)15. Another method is reaction in diluted sodium hydroxide catalysed by TBAH adding 24 to 26 hydroxyl groups. Hydroxylation has also been reported using solvent-free NaOH / hydrogen peroxide. C60(OH)8 was prepared using a multistep procedure starting from a mixed peroxide fullerene.  The maximum number of hydroxyl groups that can be attached (hydrogen peroxide method) stands at 36–40.

Electrophilic additions
Fullerenes react in electrophilic additions as well. The reaction with bromine can add up to 24 bromine atoms to the sphere. The record holder for fluorine addition is C60F48. According to in silico predictions the as yet elusive C60F60 may have some of the fluorine atoms in endo positions (pointing inwards) and may resemble a tube more than it does a sphere.

Eliminations
Protocols have been investigated for removing substituents via eliminations after they have served their purpose. Examples are the retro-Bingel reaction and the retro-Prato reaction.

Carbene additions
Fullerenes react with carbenes to methanofullerenes. The reaction of fullerene with dichlorocarbene (created by sodium trichloroacetate pyrolysis) was first reported in 1993. A single addition takes place along a [6,6] bond.

Radical additions
Fullerenes can be considered radical scavengers. With a simple hydrocarbon radical such as the t-butyl radical obtained by thermolysis or photolysis from a suitable precursor the tBuC60 radical is formed that can be studied. The unpaired electron does not delocalize over the entire sphere but takes up positions in the vicinity of the tBu substituent.

Fullerenes as ligands

Fullerene is a ligand in organometallic chemistry. The organometallic chemistry of C60 is dictated by its spherical geometry and localized polyalkene π-electronic structure. All reported derivatives are η2 complexe in which the metal coordinates at a six–six ring fusion with formal double bond. No analogous η4-diene or η6-triene complexes are prepared.

C60 and C70 form complexes with a variety of molecules. In the solid state lattice structures are stabilized by the intermolecular interactions. Charge transfer complexes are formed with weak electron donors. The [6,6] double bond is electron-deficient and usually forms metallic bonds with η = 2 hapticity. Bonding modes such as η = 5 or η = 6 can be induced by modification of the coordination sphere.
[C60][ferrocene]2, in which the C60 molecules are arranged in close-packed layers
[C60][1,4-dihydroquinone]3 has C60 molecules trapped in a hydrogen-bonded of 1,4-dihydroquinone molecules
The solvated C60 compounds: [C60][C6H6]4 and [C60][CH2I2][C6H6], and the intercalate [C60][I2]2, are structurally characterized.
[C70][S8]6
[C60][γ-cyclodextrin]2
C60 fullerene reacts with tungsten hexacarbonyl W(CO)6 to the (η²-C60)W(CO)5 complex in a hexane solution in direct sunlight.

Variants

Open-cage fullerenes
A part of fullerene research is devoted to so-called open-cage fullerenes  whereby one or more bonds are removed chemically exposing an orifice. In this way it is possible to insert into it small molecules such as hydrogen, helium or lithium. The first such open-cage fullerene was reported in 1995. In endohedral hydrogen fullerenes the opening, hydrogen insertion and closing back up has already been demonstrated.

Heterofullerenes

In heterofullerenes at least one carbon atom is replaced by another element. Based on spectroscopy, substitutions have been reported with boron (borafullerenes), nitrogen (azafullerenes), oxygen, arsenic, germanium, phosphorus, silicon, iron, copper, nickel, rhodium and iridium.
Reports on isolated heterofullerenes are limited to those based on nitrogen  and oxygen.

The fullerene oxides C60O and C70O are observed in minor in fullerene-containing soot. Only C60O is isolated as a pure compound in macroscopic amounts.

Fullerene dimers
The C60 fullerene dimerizes in a formal [2+2] cycloaddition to a C120 bucky dumbbell in the solid state by mechanochemistry (high-speed vibration milling) with potassium cyanide as a catalyst. The trimer has also been reported using 4-aminopyridine as catalyst (4% yield)  and observed with scanning tunneling microscopy as a monolayer.

Synthesis

Multistep fullerene synthesis 
Although the procedure for the synthesis of the C60 fullerene is well established (generation of a large current between two nearby graphite electrodes in an inert atmosphere) a 2002 study  described an organic synthesis of the compound starting from simple organic compounds.

In the final step a large polycyclic aromatic hydrocarbon consisting of 13 hexagons and three pentagons was submitted to flash vacuum pyrolysis at 1100 °C and 0.01 Torr. The three carbon chlorine bonds served as free radical incubators and the ball was stitched up in a no-doubt complex series of radical reactions.  The chemical yield was low: 0.1 to 1%.  A small percentage of fullerenes is formed in any process which involves burning of hydrocarbons, e.g. in candle burning. The yield through a combustion method is often above 1%. The method proposed above does not provide any advantage for synthesis of fullerenes compared to the usual combustion method, and therefore, the organic synthesis of fullerenes remains a challenge for chemistry.

Continuous high-resolution transmission electron microscopic video imaging of the electron-beam-induced bottom-up synthesis of fullerene C60 through cyclodehydrogenation of C60H30 was reported in 2021.

A similar exercise aimed at construction of a C78 cage in 2008 (but leaving out the precursor's halogens) did not result in a sufficient yield but at least the introduction of Stone Wales defects could be ruled out. C60 synthesis through a fluorinated fullerene precursor was reported in 2013

Purification
Fullerene purification is the process of obtaining a fullerene compound free of contamination. In fullerene production mixtures of C60, C70 and higher homologues are always formed. Fullerene purification is key to fullerene science and determines fullerene prices and the success of practical applications of fullerenes. The first available purification method for C60 fullerene was by HPLC from which small amounts could be generated at large expense.

A practical laboratory-scale method for purification of soot enriched in C60 and C70 starts with extraction in toluene followed by filtration with a paper filter. The solvent is evaporated and the residue (the toluene-soluble soot fraction) redissolved in toluene and subjected to column chromatography. C60 elutes first with a purple color and C70 is next displaying a reddish-brown color.

In nanotube processing the established purification method for removing amorphous carbon and metals is by competitive oxidation (often a sulfuric acid / nitric acid mixture). It is assumed that this oxidation creates oxygen containing groups (hydroxyl, carbonyl, carboxyl) on the nanotube surface which electrostatically stabilize them in water and which can later be utilized in chemical functionalization. One report  reveals that the oxygen containing groups in actuality combine with carbon contaminations absorbed to the nanotube wall that can be removed by a simple base wash. Cleaned nanotubes are reported to have reduced D/G ratio indicative of less functionalization, and the absence of oxygen is also apparent from IR spectroscopy and X-ray photoelectron spectroscopy.

Experimental purification strategies 
A recent kilogram-scale fullerene purification strategy was demonstrated by Nagata et al. In this method C60 was separated from a mixture of C60, C70 and higher fullerene compounds by first adding the amidine compound DBU to a solution of the mixture in 1,2,3-trimethylbenzene. DBU as it turns out only reacts to C70 fullerenes and higher which reaction products separate out and can be removed by filtration. C60 fullerenes do not have any affinity for DBU and are subsequently isolated. Other diamine compounds like DABCO do not share this selectivity.

C60 but not C70 forms a 1:2 inclusion compound with cyclodextrin (CD). A separation method for both fullerenes based on this principle is made possible by anchoring cyclodextrin to colloidal gold particles through a sulfur-sulfur bridge. The Au/CD compound is very stable and soluble in water and selectively extracts C60 from the insoluble mixture after refluxing for several days. The C70 fullerene component is then removed by simple filtration. C60 is driven out from the Au/CD compound by adding adamantol which has a higher affinity for the cyclodextrin cavity. Au/CD is completely recycled when adamantol in turn is driven out by adding ethanol and ethanol removed by evaporation; 50 mg of Au/CD captures 5 mg of C60 fullerene.

See also
 Solubility of fullerenes
 Geodesic polyarene

References

Geodesic polyarenes
Fullerenes